Nature Notebook is an Australian television series which aired in 1958 on ABC Television. The educational series was intended for schools and aired live in Melbourne on Wednesdays, but the episodes were kinescoped and shown at 7:30PM on Thursdays. Six episodes were produced, subject matters included Australian mammals, and the importance and functions of teeth. It may have also been shown in Sydney.

References

External links

1950s Australian documentary television series
1958 Australian television series debuts
1958 Australian television series endings
Australian Broadcasting Corporation original programming
English-language television shows
Black-and-white Australian television shows